Aftersun is a 2022 drama film written and directed by Charlotte Wells, starring Paul Mescal, Frankie Corio and Celia Rowlson-Hall. It was released in the United States on 21 October 2022 by A24 and in the United Kingdom on 18 November 2022 by Mubi.

Aftersun is a period film set in the late 1990s and follows Sophie, an 11-year-old Scottish girl, on vacation with her father at a Turkish resort on the eve of his 31st birthday.

The film received universal acclaim from critics, who praised Wells' direction and screenplay, and the performances of Mescal and Corio with the former earning a nomination for Academy Award for Best Actor. It was also named one of the best films of 2022 by the National Board of Review and was awarded top place by Sight and Sound on its poll for the best films of the year.

Accolades

References

External links 
 

Aftersun